Mai is a name that is used as a given name and a surname.

People with the given name
Mai (Arabic name)
Mai, the title of Sayfawa dynasty kings of Chad
Mai (singer) (born 1984), formerly known as Ruppina, a J-Pop singer
Omai, also known as Mai, the first person from the Pacific Islands to visit Europe
Mai Atafo, Nigerian fashion designer
Mai Charoenpura, Thai pop singer from Bangkok
Mai Fuchigami (born 1987), Japanese voice actress and singer
Mai Gehrke (born 1964), Danish mathematician
Mai Kadowaki, Japanese voice actress
Mai Kolossova (born 1937), Estonian politician
Mai Kuraki (born 1982), J-pop singer
Mai Hagiwara (born 1996), J-pop singer under Hello! Project and a member of the Japanese band, Cute
Mai Hoshimura (born 1981), J-pop singer under the Sony Music Japan label
Mai Ito (born 1984), Japanese marathon runner
, Japanese ice hockey player
Mai Matsumuro, (born 1983), Japanese singer, composer and a former member of J-pop girl band, Dream
, Japanese figure skater
, Japanese model and television personality
, Japanese make-up artist and businesswoman
Mai Murakami, Japanese artistic gymnast
Mai Murdmaa (born 1938), Estonian choreographer, ballet dancer, ballet master and director
Mai Nakahara (born 1981), Japanese voice actress and singer
Mai Narva (born 1999), Estonian chess player
Mai Raud-Pähn (born 1920), Estonian-Swedish art historian, editor and journalist
Mai Shiraishi (born 1992), Japanese idol group Nogizaka46
Mai Traore (born 1999), Guinean footballer
Mai Villadsen (born 1991), Danish politician
Mai Yamada, Taiwanese politician
, Japanese women's basketball player
Mai Yamane, (born 1958), Japanese English-language blues singer
Mai Zetterling, Swedish actress and film director

People with the surname
Mai (Chinese surname), the Chinese surname 麥 (simplified 麦), pronounced Mak in Cantonese
Mai (Vietnamese surname) (Chữ Nôm: 梅), the Vietnamese pronunciation of Mei (surname)
 Ella Mai, British singer and songwriter
Jeannie Mai, American makeup artist, fashion expert, actress, and TV personality
Josef Mai, German World War I flying ace
Lukas Mai, German footballer
Mai Huu Xuan - General in the Army of the Republic of Vietnam
Vanessa Mai, German singer

Fictional characters
Mai, a supporting character in the animated show Avatar: The Last Airbender and the graphic novels.
Mai, one of Pilaf's henchmen in Dragon Ball
Mai, a main character from the anime and eroge game in Popotan
Mai Kazami (Trixie in the english dub), a character from the anime Speed Racer X
Mai Kawasumi, a character from the visual novel, anime, and manga in Kanon
Mai Kawakami, a character in the novel and anime Myriad Colors Phantom World who serves as the main protagonist's training partner
Mai Kobayashi, a character in Super Robot Wars: Original Generations
Mai Kuju, from Mai the Psychic Girl, a 1985 manga
Mai Midorikawa, a character in Ultraman Dyna
Mai Minakami, a main character from the anime and manga series Nichijou
Mai Mishō, co-protagonist of Futari wa Pretty Cure Splash Star
Mai Natsume, a character in the video game series BlazBlue
Mai Nametsu, a manager of Date Teach High in manga series Haikyū!!
Mai Shiranui, a character in the Fatal Fury and The King of Fighters series of video games
Mai Taniyama, a character in the anime and manga Ghost Hunt
Mai Tokiha, the title character in the anime and manga My-HiME (originally Mai-HiME), and a supporting character in My-Otome
Mai Tsubasa (aka Change Phoenix), a character in Dengeki Sentai Changeman
Mai Tsurugi, a character from Your Turn To Die
Mai Valentine (Mai Kujaku in the Japanese version), a character from the anime Yu-Gi-Oh! Duel Monsters
Mai Tateno, a character in Inazuma Eleven
Mai Hakua, a character in Bakuryū Sentai Abaranger
Mai Sakurajima, a character in Rascal Does Not Dream of Bunny Girl Senpai
Mai from Senran Kagura video game franchise
Mai Kanzaki, a character in Idol x Warrior Miracle Tunes!
Mai Zenin, a character in Jujutsu Kaisen

See also
 Mai (disambiguation)

Estonian feminine given names
Japanese feminine given names
Surnames from nicknames